ʿUmar ibn al-Walīd ibn ʿAbd al-Malik was an Umayyad prince, commander in the Arab–Byzantine wars and the governor of Jund al-Urdunn (district of Jordan) during the reign of his father al-Walid I. He may have patronized the Umayyad desert palaces of Khirbat al-Minya in modern Israel and Qasr Kharana in modern Jordan.

Life
Umar was a son of the Umayyad caliph al-Walid I and one of his slave concubines. Al-Walid appointed Umar governor of Jund al-Urdunn (the military district of the [River] Jordan; e.g. modern southern Lebanon, northern Israel and northern Jordan). He was the commander of the Hajj pilgrimage to Mecca in November 707. In 710/11, Umar led an expedition against Byzantine territory alongside his uncle Maslama ibn Abd al-Malik. As governor of Jordan, Umar questioned Peter of Capitolias, who was made a Christian saint, at some point before his adjudication and execution by al-Walid.

Representing the interests of Marwanid (Umayyad ruling house) princes who were negatively affected by Caliph Umar II's economic policies, which reversed al-Walid's liberal distribution of war spoils among members of the ruling family, Umar wrote a letter to the caliph; in it he accuses the caliph of abandoning his predecessor's policies, accusing them of oppression, and detesting their descendants, to which the caliph responded by alleging the Umayyads abandoned the correct path by misusing public funds, illicitly shedding blood and ruling tyrannically. Umar is recorded by the sources as being in a lawsuit in 738/39 with the future Alid rebel leader Zayd ibn Ali, which was settled by Caliph Hisham ibn Abd al-Malik. He is recorded again having a legal dispute, this time with his cousin, Caliph al-Walid II, over a slave girl seized by the caliph. According to the historian al-Ya'qubi (d. 897), Umar led the tribes of Jordan against his half-brother, Caliph Yazid III during the Third Muslim civil war.

Umar may have patronized the construction of the Khirbat al-Minya palace near the Sea of Galilee, according to Jere Bacharach. Umar is mentioned in numerous Arabic inscriptions found in the Syrian Desert palace of Qasr Kharana in modern Jordan, about 60 kilometers east of Amman. The inscriptions attest to visits by the prince at the beginning of the 8th century. The names of his sons Abd al-Malik and Abd Allah are each mentioned at least once in the inscriptions as well. The palace likely served as a resting place between Syria and Mecca.

Descendants
Umar was dubbed "the stallion of the Banu Marwan (the Marwanids)" or "the stud of the Banu Umayya (the Umayyads)" for his numerous marriages and his fathering of some sixty sons. Among his wives was Umm Abd Allah bint Habib, a granddaughter of al-Hakam ibn Abi al-As (Umar's paternal great-great-grandfather) with whom he had his son Abd al-Malik. 

Abd al-Malik's son Habib escaped the massacre of the Umayyad family at Nahr Abi Futrus in the aftermath of the Abbasid Revolution of 750 and established himself in the Umayyad emirate in al-Andalus (the Iberian Peninsula). There, the founder of the emirate, Habib's distant cousin Abd al-Rahman I, appointed him governor of Toledo and granted him properties around Cordoba, Cabra, Rayyu (Málaga and Archidona) and Porcuna. His descendants were an influential family known as the Habibi clan. Umar's sons Isa and Hafs also relocated to al-Andalus. Descendants of Abd al-Malik and Isa are named by the sources as members of the Umayyad elite in al-Andalus up to the late 10th century.

References

Bibliography

8th-century Arabs
People of the Third Fitna
Sons of Umayyad caliphs
Umayyad people of the Arab–Byzantine wars
Umayyad governors of Jordan